The 1963–64 IHL season was the 19th season of the International Hockey League, a North American minor professional league. Seven teams participated in the regular season, and the Toledo Blades won the Turner Cup.

Regular season

Turner Cup-Playoffs

External links
 Season 1963/64 on hockeydb.com

1963–64 in Canadian ice hockey by league
IHL
International Hockey League (1945–2001) seasons